Hugo Kauder (9 June 188822 July 1972) was an Austrian-Jewish composer, pedagogue, and music theorist. He defied the atonal trend of his generation with his uniquely harmonic, contrapuntal style. His legacy of over 300 works, many yet to be published, is receiving renewed interest today.

Biography

Kauder was born in Tovačov. His father, Ignaz Kaude, was Oberlehrer (principal) of the local German language primary school. As a boy, Hugo Kauder had violin lessons with the local teacher, who eventually dismissed him when he had “taught him everything he knew.” These lessons were his only formal training in music. In 1905, Kauder moved to Vienna to study engineering but often skipped school with classmate Egon Lustgarten to study scores in the Imperial Court Library. Of particular interest to him were several volumes of Denkmäler der Tonkunst in Österreich (Monuments of Music in Austria), mainly works of Flemish composers of the 15th and 16th centuries.

From 1911 to 1917, Kauder played violin in the Wiener Tonkuenstler Orchester under such conductors as Ferdinand Loewe, Franz Schalk, Arthur Nikisch, and Richard Strauss. There he began a lifelong friendship with Dutch horn player Willem Valkenier (1887–1986), inspiring his numerous horn compositions. From 1917 to 1922, Kauder was the violist of the Gottesmann Quartet.

In 1919, he met poet and philosopher Rudolph Pannwitz. Though he could not play an instrument, Pannwitz composed settings of classic poems, following his idea — quite unconventional at the time — that composers should find and reveal the music latent in texts, rather than creating the musical setting at will. Kauder adopted and elaborated this approach to vocal music and regarded Pannwitz as a lifelong mentor.

In 1923 Kauder married the linguist, archeologist, and bible scholar Helene Guttman (1898–1949), a cousin of his study companion Egon Lustgarten.

For the rest of his life, in Vienna and later in New York City, Kauder was self-employed as a composer and teacher of violin, music theory, and composition. As part of his efforts to bring his music to life, he conducted a chorus and a chamber ensemble of students and friends (including his son Otto) who studied and performed the classics as well as his own compositions.

Notable musicians who appreciated and performed Kauder’s music in Vienna before 1938 and to some extent after 1945 included the Gottesmann Quartet, Sedlak-Winkler, Rosé Quartet, and the Kolbe string quartet; the conductors Josef Mertin, Viktor Bermeiser, Siegmund Levarie, Karl Ristenpart, and Alexander Zemlinsky; pianist Adolf Baller, hornist Ernst Paul, and oboist Alexander Wunderer.

Hugo Kauder Society
A Hugo Kauder Society was founded in 2002 to foster awareness and appreciation of the composer and to provide opportunities to emerging musicians to perform his works. In 2003, the society established an International Music Competition to provide opportunities for young musicians to present and in some cases premiere Hugo Kauder's music.

References

External links
"Hugo Kauder Biography" – The Hugo Kauder Society
"Hugo Kauder Papers, Papers—Special Collections Research Center, University of Chicago Library"
Hugo Kauder Society papers, 1911-2006 Music Division, New York Public Library for the Performing Arts.

1888 births
1972 deaths
20th-century classical music
20th-century classical violinists
20th-century male musicians
20th-century Austrian musicologists
Austrian composers
Austrian male composers
Austrian classical violinists
Austrian classical violists
Austrian music theorists
Austrian people of Moravian-German descent
Male classical violinists
Moravian-German people
People from Tovačov
20th-century Austrian Jews
Jewish classical composers
20th-century violists